Vallendar is a Verbandsgemeinde ("collective municipality") in the district Mayen-Koblenz, in Rhineland-Palatinate, Germany. The seat of the municipality is in Vallendar.

The Verbandsgemeinde Vallendar consists of the following Ortsgemeinden ("local municipalities"):

 Niederwerth 
 Urbar 
 Vallendar
 Weitersburg

Verbandsgemeinde in Rhineland-Palatinate